Common maidenhair fern is a common name for several plants and may refer to:

Adiantum aethiopicum
Adiantum capillus-veneris